Hans Gerhard Stub (23 February 1849 – 1 August 1931) was an American Lutheran  theologian and church leader. He served as Bishop of the Norwegian Lutheran Church in America.

Background
Hans Gerhard Stub was born in Muskego, Wisconsin. His parents were Lutheran Pastor Hans Andreas Stub (1822–1907) and Ingeborg Margrethe Arentz (1815–1892), both immigrants from Norway. Hans Stub was born in an immigrant cabin in Wisconsin. He was shaped from childhood by the life within the Norwegian Synod, which his father had help found in 1853. He studied for a time in Norway at the Bergen Cathedral School.

Stub later attended Luther College and belonged to the first class that graduated from there in 1866. He was a theological candidate at Concordia Seminary in St. Louis, Missouri in 1872 and became a pastor in Minneapolis during 1878.
He was a professor of theology and from 1879 head of Luther Seminary, first in Madison, Wisconsin, later in St. Paul, Minnesota. From 1881 to 1882, he studied at the Leipzig University.

Ministry
He was a pastor position in Decorah, Iowa (1896–1900) and later became a professor at Luther College (1898–1900). In 1900 he was a professor and head of the Luther Seminary. He was editor of several journals, including the Norwegian language Teologisk tidsskrift (1899–1908). Stub was also the author of numerous books and articles.

Stub was head of the Norwegian Synod from 1911. On June 9, 1917, the United Norwegian Lutheran Church of America, the Hauge Synod, and the Norwegian Synod merged.  From 1917 to 1925, Stub served as the first Bishop of the Norwegian Lutheran Church in America, which resulted from the church unification. He was also a founder and later president (1918–21) of the National Lutheran Council in the United States.

Hans G. Stub was appointed a Knight of the 1st Class of the Royal Norwegian Order of St. Olav in 1908, Commander in 1912, and received the Grand Cross in 1926. Stub was the recipient of the first honorary degree granted by Luther College (Doctor of Laws) on his 75th birthday, February 23, 1924. He also received honorary degrees from Capitol University and St. Olaf College.  The papers of Hans Gerhard Stub are contained within the Luther College Archives.

Personal life
Hans Stub was married three times. In 1876 with Didrikke Aall Ottesen (1855–1879), daughter of Luther Church leader, Jacob Aall Ottesen (1825–1904). In 1884 with Valborg Charlotte Amalie Hovind (1860–1901), and in 1906 with Anna Skabo (1867–1960).  Through his second wife, he was the brother -in-law of Norwegian publisher, Hagbard Emanuel Berner.

Selected works
Om Naadevalget (1881)Foredrag mod det humanistiske og saakaldte kristelige Frimureri (1882)Hr. Kristofer Jansons prædiken (1893)Fra fars og mors liv (1907)Hvad staar iveien for det kirkelige enighedsarbeide blandt os? (1911)Foreningssagens Gang (1916)Interchurch World Movement   (1920)Reminiscenses from Bygone Days (1922)

References

Other sources
Norlie, O. E. Norske lutherske prester i Amerika 1843–1913 (Minneapolis, 1914)
Norlie, O. E. Luther College through sixty years, 1861–1921 (Decorah, IA, 1922)
 Stub, Jacob Aal Ottesen Some Memories of My Father (in Lutheran Almanac, Minneapolis, 1932)
 Nelson, E. Clifford The Lutheran Church Among Norwegian-Americans'' (Minneapolis, 1960)

External links
Bust of Hans Gerhard Stub  (Paul Fjelde. 1926)

1849 births
1931 deaths
American people of Norwegian descent
People educated at the Bergen Cathedral School
American expatriates in Norway
People from Muskego, Wisconsin
20th-century American Lutheran clergy
Luther College (Iowa) alumni
Leipzig University alumni
Writers from Iowa
Writers from Wisconsin
Religious leaders from Wisconsin
Concordia Seminary alumni
19th-century American Lutheran clergy